The Journal of Web Semantics is a bimonthly peer-reviewed scientific journal published by Elsevier. It covers knowledge technologies, ontology, software agents, databases and the semantic grid, information retrieval, human language technology, data mining, and semantic web development. The journal is abstracted and indexed by Scopus and the Science Citation Index. According to the Journal Citation Reports, the journal has a 2020 impact factor of 1.897.

References

External links

 Preprint Server, News and Announcements

Computer science journals
Knowledge management journals
Elsevier academic journals
Publications established in 2003
Quarterly journals
English-language journals